Andrew Irving Aitken (15 October 1919 – 8 June 2000) was a Scottish amateur footballer who made over 170 appearances in the Scottish League for Queen's Park as an inside right. He represented Great Britain at the 1948 Summer Olympics.

Personal life 
Prior to and during the Second World War, Aitken worked for David Colville & Sons in Motherwell.

References

External links 

 

1919 births
2000 deaths
Footballers from Glasgow
Queen's Park F.C. players
Scottish Football League players
Footballers at the 1948 Summer Olympics
Olympic footballers of Great Britain
People from Cathcart
Shawfield F.C. players
Third Lanark A.C. wartime guest players
Hamilton Academical F.C. wartime guest players
Association football inside forwards
Scottish footballers
Scottish Junior Football Association players